White Castle may refer to:

Castles 
 White Castle, Monmouthshire, Wales
 White Castle, Nunraw, East Lothian, Scotland
 White House of Choghtu Khong Tayiji, or White Castle, Bulgan Aimag, Mongolia

Other uses 
 White Castle, Louisiana, U.S.
 White Castle (film), a 2013 Burmese drama film
 White Castle (restaurant), an American hamburger restaurant chain
 The White Castle, a 1985 novel by Orhan Pamuk
 The White Castle (radio drama), a 2008 installment in the Jack Flanders adventure series
 Whitecastle (community) a community in Wales

See also

Harold & Kumar Go to White Castle, a 2004 American comedy film
White's Castle, Athy, Ireland